Abu Abd Allah Mahamad ibn Ahmad Mayyara (1591–1662) was a jurist and theologian from Fes, one of the most reputable scholars of his time. He is the author of  a commentary on the Tuhfa by Ibn Asim,  a commentary on Al-Musrhid al mumin by his teacher Ibn Ashir and Sharh al-Shaykh Mayyara li-Lamiyya al-Zaqqaq, a commentary on al-Zaqqaq's Lamiyya. Mayyara's Nazm al-la'ali wa-l-durar contains a fahrasa and hence biographical information about himself. Well known is also his work called Nasihat al Mughtarrin in defence of Bildiyyīn (Muslims, like himself, of Jewish descent) whose position had been deteriorating after the death of Ahmad al-Mansur in 1603.

References

Asharis
Moroccan writers
1591 births
1662 deaths
Moroccan Maliki scholars
People from Fez, Morocco
17th-century Moroccan people
16th-century Moroccan people